Skin Trade is a 2014 American action thriller film directed by Ekachai Uekrongtham. It stars Dolph Lundgren, Tony Jaa, Michael Jai White, and Ron Perlman. Lundgren wrote the film with Gabriel Dowrick and Steven Elder, while John Hyams performed uncredited script revisions. The film centers around New Jersey police detective Nick Cassidy, as he travels to Asia intent on killing the man who murdered his family, mobster Viktor Dragovic.

Development started in 2007 after Lundgren read a news report about a group of girls being smuggled into the United States from Mexico. The girls were left in a vehicle along the border and, trapped inside, they all died of heat stroke and suffocation. Skin Trade had a $9 million production budget, and was shot over 50 days in Canada and Thailand.

The film premiered at the American Film Market on November 7, 2014. This was followed by a limited theatrical release, starting on April 9, 2015, in the United Arab Emirates, and succeeded by Thailand (on April 23), Malaysia (on April 30), and the United States (on May 8). The film grossed $384 000 at the worldwide box office, but received mostly negative reviews; particular criticism was aimed at Jaa's fluency in English, as well as the film's approach to the topic of human trafficking.

Plot

In the prologue, a Cambodian girl leaves her village for Bangkok. Upon arriving, she is drugged, kidnapped and sold into the "skin trade" (human trafficking).

In Newark, New Jersey, Nick Cassidy, a Newark Police Department detective, discovers that Viktor Dragovic, a Serbian mobster, is in New Jersey. Meanwhile, in Bangkok, detective Tony Vitayakul attempts to buy a Thai girl from a group of human traffickers. When his cover is blown, he subdues the traffickers and frees the girl. He collects information regarding the ship used to transport trafficked girls, its destination, and that Dragovic will be there to receive the shipment.

Cassidy and his superior officer, Captain Costello, brief a group of police officers on Dragovic, revealing he is a major player in human trafficking worldwide. As the ship carrying Dragovic's container approaches the US, Cassidy and his men prepare to intercept it at the dock. When the ship arrives, Dragovic discovers the trafficked women have died during the transport. The ship's captain is held responsible, tortured and shot in the head. A shootout erupts as the police move in. Cassidy chases Dragovic and his youngest son Andre. He fatally shoots Andre in self-defense and Dragovic is arrested. While in custody, Dragovic arranges to have Cassidy's family murdered and his house blown up. Cassidy's wife and daughter are killed while Cassidy survives, despite being shot in the back.

Captain Costello and Reed, an FBI agent, visit Cassidy in the hospital. They tell him Dragovic fled the US after being bailed. After they leave, Cassidy steals an opiate drug and clothing before leaving the hospital unnoticed. He gets his guns and goes to the restaurant of Dragovic's attorney. After forcing the attorney to reveal Dragovic's whereabouts, Cassidy shoots him and blows up the restaurant.

In Cambodia, Senator Khat warns Dragovic that unless he leaves the country immediately, he will be arrested and extradited to the US. Dragovic blackmails the Senator into giving him two weeks to put his affairs in order and flee.

Cassidy travels to Thailand in pursuit of Dragovic. Believing that Cassidy has experienced a nervous breakdown, the US authorities have sent Reed to detain him. Tony and his partner Nung are ordered to assist with the arrest. At Suvarnabhumi airport, Cassidy runs away from the police. Reed, who has been bribed by Dragovic, kills Nung and blames Cassidy for the murder. Vitayakul pursues Cassidy through the streets but fails to capture him. Cassidy reaches a nightclub in Poipet. After torturing one of Dragovic's men, he discovers the location of Dragovic's current operations. Vitayakul and Reed arrive at the nightclub to arrest Cassidy. After fighting with Vitayakul, an injured Cassidy escapes again. Meanwhile, Reed uses the timing of a call on Vitayakul's cell phone to discover an informant: Vitayakul's girlfriend Min. While Cassidy is attempting to locate Janko, Dragovic's illegitimate son, who oversees Dragovic's human trafficking business in southeast Asia, a shootout erupts between Cassidy and Janko's men. Janko flees the warehouse but is killed by Ivan and Goran Dragovic, his half-brothers, on behalf of their father. Vitayakul arrives to kill Cassidy, but after learning the truth about his partner's death, he fights and kills Reed instead. Janko reveals his father's location before dying.

The next day, Cassidy and Vitayakul team up and storm Dragovic's compound. Ivan is holding Min at gunpoint, but Vitayakul shoots him. Cassidy destroys a vehicle with a rocket launcher. As a result, Dragovic's helicopter leaves without him. During a shootout between the two detectives and Dragovic's men, Goran is killed in a hand-to-hand fight with Vitayakul. After that, Cassidy fights with Dragovic, ultimately stabbing him in the chest, despite Dragovic commandeering a second helicopter. Dragovic then tells Cassidy that his daughter Sofia was not killed, but instead sold into the human trafficking trade. He fails to learn the whereabouts of his daughter from the dying Dragovic.

In the aftermath, Cassidy says goodbye to Vitayakul and Min. He gives them a picture of Sofia and asks them to keep it until he finds her. He then sets out in search of his daughter on his own.

Cast

Dolph Lundgren as Detective Nick Cassidy, a New Jersey police detective seeking to avenge the murder of his family
Tony Jaa as Detective Tony Vitayakul, a Thailand police detective tasked with arresting Cassidy
Michael Jai White as Agent Reed, a corrupt FBI agent working for Dragovic
Ron Perlman as Viktor Dragovic, a Serbian war criminal also a mobster running an international human trafficking ring
Mike Dopud as Goran Dragovic, Viktor's eldest son, who oversees his father's operations in the Middle-East
David Westerman as Ivan Dragovic, Viktor's other son, who oversees his father's operations in South-East Asia
Leo Rano as Janko Dragovic, Viktor's son from another relationship, who manages a chain of nightclubs in Thailand
Michael G. Selby as Andre Dragovic, Viktor's youngest son
Celina Jade as Min, Tony's girlfriend
Peter Weller as Captain Costello, the captain of Cassidy's police department in Newark, New Jersey
Tasya Teles as Rosa Cassidy, Nick's wife
Chloe Babcook as Sofia Cassidy, Nick's teenage daughter

The film also stars Cary-Hiroyuki Tagawa as Khat, a member of the Cambodian Senate; Maethi Thapthimthong as Nung, Vitayakul's partner on the Thai police force; and Bryce Hodgson as Dex, a petty criminal from New Jersey. The film's co-writer, Steven Elder, appears in a minor role as Dragovic's attorney.

Production

Development and writing

Lundgren started researching human trafficking in 2005. He claimed there were "20 million slaves in the world", and that human trafficking was a "$20 billion industry"; the world's "second largest" illegal trafficking enterprise (as of 2015). He started developing Skin Trade in 2007, after reading a news report about a group of girls being smuggled into the United States from Mexico. The girls were left in a vehicle along the border; trapped inside and with no means of escape, they all died of heat stroke and suffocation. Lundgren, who had two young daughters at the time, felt the story of human trafficking "had to be told". He empathized with the victims, saying: "these people are physically humiliated [and] psychologically abused to have no self worth, sort of like [how] I used to feel".

Lundgren wrote the screenplay with Gabriel Dowrick and Steven Elder, while John Hyams performed uncredited script revisions, seven in total, frequently regarding the setting as Lundgren sought financing. The original script was set in Russia. Lundgren even went as far as to personally scout for locations and actors, and to seek financing in Moscow, but it "didn't work out". He changed the setting to Southeast Asia after meeting "someone" interested in financing the film.

Casting
Originally, Lundgren planned on playing a supporting role, with a more famous actor in the lead. He also considered directing the film, but decided against it, as he desired to learn more about producing. In 2013, Lundgren announced the casting of Tony Jaa, in the role of Tony Vitayakul; and Ekachai Uekrongtham as the director. Lundgren chose Uekrongtham after being impressed with his film, Beautiful Boxer. He contacted him through a mutual friend in Los Angeles, and in mid-2013, they arranged to meet in the city. While he had previously turned down scripts offered to him for international markets, Uekrongtham found Skin Trade "riveting". He said the script "[had] the potential to work as a character-driven piece while saying something about how we deal with scars, literal and otherwise". Jaa, on the other hand, met with Lundgren through his manager and film agent. He couldn't speak any English when cast, but claimed to have taken "intensive" lessons in preparation for his role; stating he is now "reasonably fluent" in "conversational" English.

Tasya Teles was cast as Rosa Cassidy on Christmas Day, 2013. She was heading to Thailand for a holiday "after a year of hard work", and her agent phoned to tell her about the "perfect role"; even insisting on her having a "quick look" at the script. Once Teles realized Skin Trade was about human trafficking, she was "instantly hooked".

On February 7, 2014, SC Films announced the casting of Michael Jai White, Ron Perlman, Peter Weller, Celina Jade, and Cary-Hiroyuki Tagawa. The film's co-producer, Craig Baumgarten, was White's and Weller's manager; he secured them both roles in the film. Weller was the original choice to play Viktor Dragovic, but due to scheduling issues, the role went to Perlman instead. Furthermore, Lundgren considered having White to co-star; White only accepted the role of FBI agent Reed after finding the script "appealing".

Filming

Filming began on February 2, 2014, in Thailand. Skin Trade was shot over 50 days: 43 filming in Thailand, and four filming in Vancouver, British Columbia, Canada. In Thailand, filming locations included: Suvarnabhumi Airport, the Min Buri District, the Siam Kempinski Hotel, a rice mill, a leather-bleaching factory, and a century-old mansion. Filming was briefly disrupted by public protests relating to the Thai political crisis. To avoid any further interference, the cast and crew had to travel early to get through the traffic and to the set on time. Most of the film was shot on location, but some scenes were filmed at Baanrig Studios. Skin Trade was the first film to be shot in English by an organization based in Asia (outside of Hong Kong) for an international theatrical release.

Uekrongtham arranged "a few lunches and dinners" between Lundgren and his on-screen family (Tasya Teles and Chloe Babcook), so they could bond "on a personal level" before filming scenes together. Babcook spent a week and a half filming her scenes in Bangkok, followed by a few days of filming in Vancouver.

The "heavily choreographed" fight scene between Lundgren and Jaa was planned over "a month or two". It was rehearsed for two weeks and took a further week to film. Due to Lundgren's role as co-producer, the cast had a lot of freedom to improvise their scenes. Jaa filmed his fight scenes without using wirework or CGI. He felt this would give his character "more depth" and allow him to better display his acting abilities. Jaa also performed all of his own stunts. Lundgren stated he was "very impressed" by Jaa's acting and fighting abilities. In his opinion, the majority of people wouldn't be able to perform Jaa's stunts without using wirework.

According to White, his fight scenes with Jaa were in "large part" choreographed ten minutes before filming. On the contrary, Jaa described it as something they were practicing "right up until the shoot". He recalled that while they were rehearsing the sequences and moves together "quite extensively" for a "number of days", they didn't rehearse them on the film set. The fight was filmed in three takes.

Effects
Explosions were shot at Baanrig Studios, by the special effects team that had worked on The Expendables.

Post-production
According to Lundgren, the fact that "a lot of" editors worked on the film resulted in him not having "all the control [he] wanted" over the final product. As co-producer of the film, Lundgren had assumed he would have been more involved in the editing process.

Music

Soundtrack

All of the music was written and composed by Jacob Groth. The song "Unzip Me" by Belle Rev was played in the film, but not included in the soundtrack.

Release

Theatrical
The worldwide premiere was held at California's American Film Market on November 7, 2014, while the Thailand premiere was held in Bangkok at the Siam Paragon on April 23, 2015. This was followed by theatrical releases in the United Arab Emirates (on April 9, 2015), Malaysia (on April 30), and the United States (on May 8).

On May 21, 2015, the film was screened at a fundraising event for CAST (The Coalition to Abolish Slavery & Trafficking), a charitable organization based in Los Angeles that helps to rescue and reintegrate victims of human trafficking back into society. Lundgren, who was looking for ways to "help out", started volunteering for CAST during the film's development stage.

Marketing
A teaser poster was released in 2013, followed by a teaser trailer on March 26, 2014. On April 7 of the same year, Lundgren promoted Skin Trade on CNN. He appeared live in the studio and discussed the film with news anchor Richard Quest. At the 2014 Cannes Film Festival, Hyde Park International presented potential buyers with nine minutes of footage. Magnolia Pictures acquired the U.S. distribution rights on February 20, 2015, and announced they were releasing the film through their subsidiary label, Magnet Releasing. The film's official trailer was released on March 12, 2015.

Home media
Skin Trade was released through Video-on-Demand on April 23, 2015. On August 25, Magnet Releasing distributed the film on Blu-ray and DVD. In the United States, the film was given an R rating by the Motion Picture Association of America, while in the United Kingdom, it was issued a 15 rating by the British Board of Film Classification. As of April 21, 2017, Skin Trade has grossed $1.94 million in domestic home video sales.

Reception

Box office
The film debuted in the United Arab Emirates on April 9, 2015. It peaked in fifth place at the box office, and made $79,286 from 19 screenings ($4,173 per theater). No information is available for the film's Thailand debut, but it peaked in fifth place during the second week, and grossed $137,643 from 40 screenings ($3,441 per theater). By the end of the third week, the film dropped to eleventh place at the Thai box office, making a further $3,686 (bringing the entire gross to $141,329 in Thailand). For its debut in Malaysia, Skin Trade came in sixth place, and made $98,559 from 42 screenings ($3,861 per theater). By the end of the second week, it dropped two places at the box office, making a further $32,917 from 39 screenings (bringing the entire gross to $162,163 in Malaysia). Skin Trade grossed a total of $382,784 at the foreign box office.

The film debuted in the United States on May 8, 2015, making $162 (from one theater showing) during its opening weekend. It remained in the one theater for a second week, grossing a further $510. By the end of its third and final week of release in the US, Skin Trade grossed a total of $1,242 at the domestic box office, bringing the film's entire theatrical gross to $384,026.

Critical response
Skin Trade received mostly negative reviews. Rotten Tomatoes reports that 25 percent of critics gave a positive review, the "average" rating being 4.8 out of 10. On Metacritic, the film has a score of 39 out of 100, also indicating "generally unfavorable" reviews.

Martin Tsai, of the LA Times, described the film as a "movie where cops self-righteously act as judge, jury and executioner", without considering any protocols or procedures. He also said the film barely touches upon human trafficking. Nick Schager, of Variety, came to a similar conclusion, calling the issue of human trafficking (within the film) a "window dressing" for standard "revenge-driven" action. Schager also criticized Jaa's lack of fluency in English. Other critics have had similar feelings; Ignatiy Vishnevetsky, of A.V. Club, called it one of the film's "biggest drawbacks". 

Chuck Bowen, of Slant Magazine, heavily criticized the film; he awarded zero out of four stars. He said Skin Trade "fails" to satisfy even the "qualified expectations" that someone brings to a "low-rent Dolph Lundgren ass-kicker". Bowen went on to say there is "no beauty to this film, little rhythm", and none of the "physical grace" that action-film fans "crave".

Frank Scheck, of The Hollywood Reporter, rated the film as poor, saying the film is "more suitable for late night cable viewing" than a theatrical release. He went on to criticize Uekrongtham's directing, saying that "[Uekrongtham] clearly [...] paid more attention to the casting than the onscreen mechanics. And for a film so seemingly interested in educating audiences about the evils of sex trafficking", Scheck pointed out, Uekrongtham had no problem with "including copious doses of female nudity".

Scott Tobias, of The Dissolve, rated the film two and a half out of five. Calling the film a "throwback to the one-man-army" action films of the 1980s, he said, "[i]f the film happens to raise awareness [of human trafficking]", then it's more of a "bonus than [an] objective". Tobias expressed dislike for the film's "needlessly complicated setup", which — according to him — "posits Skin Trade as the splashy global production that it [clearly] is not".

Simon Abrams, of Rogerebert.com, gave the film a positive review; he awarded three out of four stars, and praised the film's choreography and fight scenes. He said that "while time hasn't been kind to the best ass-kicking knuckle-draggers, Skin Trade is energetic, and winsome." In his opinion, the movie hails from a "decadent period of action cinema [...] when every renegade cop had a private vendetta, a pet charity/social concern, and a few lousy quips in his back pocket." He summed up his review by saying: "[y]ou can teach a new dog old tricks, though why you would want to is anyone's guess." The Action Elite's Eoin Friel also enjoyed the film; he awarded four out of five stars, and praised the choreography, stunts and fight scenes. Unlike Schager or Vishnevetsky, Friel had no issues with Jaa's fluency in English, and even felt he "handled English pretty well".

Potential sequel
Teles said she would be open to returning for a sequel; she feels the film was "set [...] up very nicely for" one, and claims "[e]verybody's wondering" if there will be a follow-up. On the possibility of a sequel, Lundgren said: "I didn't consider [Skin Trade] as a franchise, but when I was over there [in Thailand], I started thinking, 'How would I do this different? How would I stay close to the subject matter?' Organ trafficking is quite big as well, so I thought that could be interesting. We could follow up with some kind of other trade."

Notes

References

External links
 
 
 Skin Trade at Magnolia Pictures
 Skin Trade at Metacritic
 Skin Trade at The Numbers
 

2014 films
American action thriller films
American films about revenge
Films about human trafficking
Films about slavery
Films set in Bangkok
Films set in Cambodia
Films set in New Jersey
Films shot in Vancouver
Films shot in Thailand
American rape and revenge films
American vigilante films
Films about the Serbian Mafia
Thai multilingual films
English-language Thai films
American multilingual films
2014 action thriller films
2010s American films
2010s vigilante films
Films with screenplays by Dolph Lundgren